Pebbles, Volume 9 is a compilation album among the CDs in the Pebbles series; it is subtitled Southern California 2.  The previous CD in the series, Pebbles, Volume 8 also features bands from Southern California; while Highs in the Mid-Sixties, Volume 1, Highs in the Mid-Sixties, Volume 2, and Highs in the Mid-Sixties, Volume 3 showcase music from Los Angeles specifically.

Release data

This album was released on AIP Records in 1996 as #AIP-CD-5026 (although the disk is actually imprinted with the catalogue number of the previous volume).  Despite the similar catalogue number, there is no relation between the tracks on this CD and the tracks on the corresponding LP.

Notes on the tracks

According to the liner notes, the track by the Standells had not been reissued before now; and this is probably the first-released version of the early Monkees hit "I'm Not Your Stepping Stone".  One of the members of the Second Helping was Kenny Loggins, and this single is his earliest known release. The Velvet Illusions are actually not from California but were a Yakima, Washington based band; while often mentioned as having heiress Patricia Hearst's former boyfriend Steven Weed as a member, the band actually featured a different Steve Weed.  The final track is from an unreleased acetate by the band that is best known for "I Never Loved Her" (included on the Pebbles, Volume 8 CD).

The two songs by Fenwyck, "I Wanna Die" and "Iye" were produced by Zane Ashton (aka Bill Aken) who had founded Progressive Sounds of America in 1963 and recorded the two sides at Western Recorders in Hollywood, California. After an emotional breakdown when one of his artists 'Kathy Dee' suffered a stroke and died, he sold the label to the Quinlan Corporation and Jay Bonner with the stipulation that 'Fenwyck' would be the first record released under the new management. That is why the label says "Produced by Zane Ashton." Ironically, although the new owners ridiculed him as being emotionally unstable, without its founder's love of rock and roll and his production instincts, the label died a very quick death and within a year was out of business.

Track listing

 Ty Wagner and the Scotchmen: "I'm a No Count"; rel. 1966
 The Caretakers: "East Side Story"; rel. 1966
 The Hysterics: "Won't Get Far"; rel. 1965 (?)
 The Standells: "Someday You'll Cry"; rel. 1965
 The Magic Mushroom: "I'm Gone"; rel. 1966
 Fenwyck: "IYE"; rel. 1967 On Progressive Sounds of America
 The Buddhas: "Lost Innocence"; rel. 1967 (?)
 David: "I'm Not Alone"; rel. 1967 (?)
 David: "40 Miles"; rel. 1966
 The Edge: "Scene thru the Eyes"; rel. 1969
 The Second Helping: "Let Me In"; rel. 1967 (?)
 Good Feelings: "Shattered"; rel. 1968
 Gypsy Trips: "Ain't It Hard"; rel. 1965
 The Nervous Breakdowns: "I Dig Your Mind" (Rusy Evans)
 Moms Boys: "Up & Down"; rel. 1967 (?)
 W. C. Fields Memorial Electric String Band: "I'm Not Your Stepping Stone"; rel. 1966
 Children of the Mushroom: "August Mademoiselle"; rel. 1967 (?)
 The Velvet Illusions: "Velvet Illusions"; rel. 1967
 Perpetual Motion Workshop: "Won't Come Down"; rel. 1967 (?)
 The Crumpets: "Mama Baby"; rel. 1966 (?)
 Sounds Unreal: "Scene of the Crime"; rel. 1967
 Mal-T's: "Here to Stay"; rel. 1966 (?)
 Thee In Set: "They Say"; rel. 1966 (?)
 The Starfires: "Cry for Freedom"; rel. 1967 (?)

References

Pebbles (series) albums
1996 compilation albums